Edward Henry Feldman (November 25, 1920 – November 30, 1988) was an American director and producer. He was nominated for three Primetime Emmy Awards in the category Outstanding Comedy Series for his work on the television series Hogan's Heroes.

Before his television career, Feldman was a radio producer and director and also worked in the advertising business. He was in charge of the commercial division at Desilu Productions. The first show he produced was The Brothers in 1956.

Feldman died in November 1988 of heart disease in Santa Monica, California, at the age of 68.

References

External links 

1920 births
1988 deaths
People from New York (state)
American television producers
American television directors